Santa Pudenziana is a church of Rome, a basilica built in the 4th century and dedicated to Saint Pudentiana, sister of Praxedes and daughter of Pudens (mentioned by Paul the Apostle in 2 Timothy, 4: 21). It is one of the national churches in Rome, associated with Filipinos.

The authenticity of Pudentiana has been questioned and the name suggested to have originated in an adjective used to describe the house of Pudens, the Domus Pudentiana.

History 

The Basilica of Santa Pudenziana is recognized as the oldest place of Christian worship in Rome. It was erected over a 2nd-century house, probably during the pontificate of Pius I in AD 140–55, re-using part of a Roman bath facility, still visible in the structure of the apse. The structure was the residence of the pope until, in 313, Emperor Constantine I offered the Lateran Palace in its stead. In the 4th century, during the pontificate of Siricius, the building was transformed into a basilica. In the acts of the synod of 499, the building bore the titulus Pudentis, indicating that the administration of the Sacraments was permitted there. 

The basilica is situated below the modern street level. Entrance is through wrought-iron gates. Steps that were added in the 19th century descend to a square courtyard from both sides of the entrance. The architrave of the entrance hall of the faded façade (1870) has a marble frieze that used to belong to a portal of the 11th century. It is a significant work of medieval sculpture in Rome. From left to right it depicts Pastore, the first owner of the basilica; Pudentiana; Praxedes; and their father, Pudens. The columns in the nave were part of the original edifice.

The Romanesque belltower was added in the early 13th century. Restorations of 1388 by Francesco da Volterra, pursuant to order of Cardinal Enrico Caetani, Camerlengo of the Holy Roman Church, transformed the three naves into one and a dome was added that Francesco da Volterra also designed. The painting of Angels and Saints before the Savior in the interior of the dome is a fresco by Pomarancio. During these last restorations some fragments of a Laocoön group were found that were larger than those in the Vatican City. Because none was willing to pay extra for this find, the hole in the ground was filled. These fragments were never recovered. The façade was renewed in 1870 and Pietro Gagliardi added frescoes.

The right side of the basilica was part of a Roman thermae, i. e. bath house, dating to the reign of the emperor Hadrian (AD 117–38).

Interior 

On the wall behind the high altar are three paintings made in 1803 by Bernardino Nocchi representing (from left to right): St Timotheus, The Glory of St Pudentiana, and St Novatus.

The mosaic in the apse is late antique, from around the end of the 4th century; it is regarded by different groups of scholars as dating to either the pontificate of Pope Siricius (384–399) or of Innocent I (401–417), and was heavily restored in the 16th century. It is among the oldest Christian mosaics in Rome and one of the most striking mosaics outside of Ravenna, deemed the most beautiful mosaic in Rome by the 19th-century historian Ferdinand Gregorovius.

This mosaic is remarkable for its iconography. Christ is represented as a human figure rather than as a symbol, such as lamb or the good shepherd, as he was in very early Christian images. The regal nature of this representation prefigures the majestic bearing of Christ as depicted in Byzantine mosaics. Christ sits on a jewel encrusted throne, wearing a golden toga with a purple trim (a sign of imperial authority and emphasizing the authority of Christ and his church). He poses as a classical Roman teacher with his right hand extended. Christ wears a halo and holds in his left hand the text: "Dominus conservator ecclesiae Pudentianae" (The Lord is the preserver of the church of Pudentiana). He sits among his apostles, two of whom were removed during restoration. The apostles wear senatorial togas. They all have individual expressions and face the spectator. The lower part of the mosaic was removed during the restoration in the late 16th century. The depictions of the apostles on the right side have been lost in the course of time and have been replaced by new, but rather blank, mosaics. Two female figures (representing "Church" and "Synagogue") hold a wreath above the head of Peter and Paul. Above them the roofs and domes of heavenly Jerusalem (or, in another interpretation, the churches built by the emperor Constantine in Jerusalem) are depicted. Above Christ stands a large jewel encrusted cross on a hill (Golgotha), as a sign of the triumph of Christ, amidst the Christian symbols of the Four Evangelists. These iconographic symbols (angel, lion, ox and eagle) are the oldest still existing such representations of the Evangelists. The backdrop is a blue sky with an orange sunset.

One scholar has suggested that the enthroned figure in the center of the apse mosaic normally regarded as Christ, in fact represents God the Father,  which would be an extremely unusual depiction of God the Father in art at this date.

Chapels 

 The Peter chapel, on the left side of the apse, contains a part of the table at which Peter the Apostle would have held the celebration of the Eucharist in the house of Pudens. The rest of the table is embedded in the papal altar of St. John Lateran. The sculpture on the altar depicts Christ delivering the keys of Heaven to St. Peter (1594) by the architect and sculptor Giacomo della Porta. In the same chapel there are two bronze slabs in the wall, explaining that here Peter was given hospitality and that Peter offered for the first time in Rome bread and wine as a consecration of the Eucharist. The pavement is ancient. A door opens into a cortile with a small chapel that contains frescoes from the 11th century.
 Chapel of the Crucifix: contains a bronze crucifix by Achille Tamburini.
 Chapel of the Madonna of Mercy: contains the painting The Nativity of the Madonna by Lazarro Baldi
 Chapel of St. Bernard: contains a painting of St Benedict and St Catherine of Siena
 Caetani chapel: This chapel for Caetani family (family of Pope Boniface VIII) was designed by Capriano da Volterra in 1588  and, after his death in 1601, completed by Carlo Maderno. The mosaics on the floor are notable. The columns of Lumachella  marble.  The relief (1599) above the altar is by Pier Paolo Olivieri and depicts Adoration of the Magi. Giovanni Paolo Rossetti painted St Praxedes and Pudenziana collecting the Blood of the Martyrs in 1621. He also painted the fresco of the Evangelist in the ceiling, to a design by Federico Zuccari.

The statue of Saint Pudentiana (c. 1650) in a niche is by Claude Adam. The sisters’ well stands just outside the Caetani chapel in the left aisle, which is said to contain the relics of 3,000 early martyrs, many of which were brought here and hidden by Pudentiana and Praxedes. This is marked by a square porphyry slab in the floor.

Following the decline of popular piety ushered by the ecclesiastical reforms of the Second Vatican Council in 1969, the names of Pudentiana and her sister Praxedes were removed from the General Roman Calendar.

Titular church
The church serves as a titular church of cardinal. From the death on 5 July 2017 of Cardinal Joachim Meisner the Titulus  S. Pudentianae was vacant until 28 June 2018 when Pope Francis assigned the title to Cardinal Thomas Aquino Manyo Maeda. One of the former Cardinal-Priests of this basilica was Cardinal Luciano Bonaparte, great-nephew of Emperor Napoleon I.

See also
 Filipinos in Italy

References

Bibliography
 "Santa Pudenziana", katolsk.no.
 Fredric W. Schlatter, The Text in the Mosaic of Santa Pudenziana, Vigiliae Christianae, Vol. 43, No. 2 (Jun., 1989), pp. 155–165
Review by W. Eugene Kleinbauer of The Clash of Gods: A Reinterpretation of Early Christian Art, by Thomas F. Mathews, Speculum, Vol. 70, No. 4 (Oct., 1995), pp. 937–941, Medieval Academy of America, JSTOR
  Antonietta Cozzi Beccarini, "La cappella Caetani nella basilica di Santa Pudenziana in Roma", Quaderni dell'Istituto di Storia dell'Architettura, 22, 1975, pp. 143–158
 Matilda Webb, The churches and catacombs of early Christian Rome: a comprehensive guide, Sussex Academic Press (February 2002),

External links
 Kunsthistorie.com , photogallery.
 Santa Pudenziana Mosaics and Roman Origins 

4th-century churches
Santa Pudenziana
Titular churches
Santa Pudenziana
Santa Pudenziana